Carlos Quintero Arce (February 13, 1920 – February 15, 2016) was a Mexican prelate of the Catholic Church. At his death, he was the oldest Mexican bishop.

Priest 
Quintero Arce was born in Etzatlán, Mexico, and was ordained a priest on April 8, 1944, for the Archdiocese of Guadalajara. He was appointed Bishop of the Diocese of Ciudad Valles on March 20, 1961, and consecrated on May 14, 1961. Quintero Arce was appointed Coadjutor Archbishop of the Archdiocese of Hermosillo on March 3, 1966, and succeeded as bishop upon retirement of Archbishop Juan María Navarrete y Guerrero on August 18, 1968. Quintero Arce retired from the Archdiocese of Hermosillo on August 20, 1996. He died at his home in Hermosillo, Sonora, on February 15, 2016, at the age of 96.

References

External links
Catholic-Hierarchy
Archdiocese of Guadalajara 
Archdiocese  of Hermosillo 

20th-century Roman Catholic archbishops in Mexico
Quintero Arce, Carlos
1920 births
2016 deaths